is a passenger railway station  located in  Nada-ku, Kobe, Hyōgo Prefecture, Japan. It is operated by the West Japan Railway Company (JR West).

Lines
Only all-stations "Local" services stop at this station.

Station layout
The station consists of one island platform an elevated station building. The station is staffed. The station has three elevators: one at each entrance and one providing access to the platforms. Similarly, three escalators are provided: one at each entrance and one for the platforms. 

In addition to solar panels on the roof of the station, the station incorporates a system which converts electricity generated by trains when they brake to augment the station power supply, the first time such a system has been used by JR West.

Platforms

History

Details of the new station were formally announced by JR West on 2 October 2015. The name is derived from the nearby Mount Maya, after which many local features are named. JR West bore virtually all of the total construction costs of JPY 4 billion. The station opened on 26 March 2016.

Station numbering was introduced in March 2018 with Maya being assigned station number JR-A59.

Passenger statistics
In fiscal 2019, the station was used by an average of 5,785 passengers daily

Surrounding area
 Nishinada Station (Hanshin Main Line)
 Ōishi Station (Hanshin Main Line)
 Ōji-kōen Station (Hankyu Kobe Main Line)
 Hanshin Expressway Route 3
  National Route 2
 Ōji Zoo
 Ōji Stadium

See also
List of railway stations in Japan

References

External links 

 Maya Station from JR-Odekake.net 
 JR West press release (October 2015) 

Railway stations in Japan opened in 2016
Tōkaidō Main Line
Railway stations in Kobe